Andrea Kneppers (born 24 February 1993) is a Dutch competitive swimmer who specialises in freestyle.

At the 2016 European Aquatics Championships in London, Kneppers won a bronze medal in the 4 × 200 m freestyle relay, together with her teammates Esmee Vermeulen, Robin Neumann, and Femke Heemskerk.

She qualified for the 2016 Summer Olympics in Rio de Janeiro. In the 4 × 200 metre freestyle relay, her team finished 14th in the heats.

References

1993 births
Living people
Dutch female freestyle swimmers
Olympic swimmers of the Netherlands
Swimmers at the 2016 Summer Olympics
European Aquatics Championships medalists in swimming
Louisville Cardinals women's swimmers
21st-century Dutch women